Dorin Lazăr (born 23 January 1990) is a Romanian rugby union football player. He plays in the Lock position for amateur SuperLiga club Timișoara. He also plays for Romania's national team, the Oaks, making his international debut at the 2013 IRB Nations Cup in a match against the Russian Medvedi.

Career
Before joining Timișoara Saracens, Dorin Lazăr played for Steaua and București Wolves.

Personal life
Dorin is the younger brother of Mihai Lazăr who is also a professional rugby union football player who plays for Castres Olympique and the Romania national team.

Honours
Timișoara
 SuperLiga: 2013, 2015

References

External links

 Dorin Lazăr at Timișoara Saracens website

1990 births
Living people
Sportspeople from Iași
Romanian rugby union players
Romania international rugby union players
Rugby union locks